Homorthodes perturba is a species of cutworm or dart moth in the family Noctuidae. It is found in North America.

The MONA or Hodges number for Homorthodes perturba is 10544.

References

Further reading

 
 
 
 
 
 
 
 
 

Eriopygini
Moths described in 1943